Manila Commodity Exchange/Makati Commodity Exchange (MCX) is a commodity and derivatives exchange located in Ayala Avenue, Makati, Philippines. MCX currently has 84 registered members throughout the Philippines. MCX provides a platform for trading of commodities, futures contracts and options contracts on various base metals, agriculture commodities, energy, and currencies. The monthly volume on all contracts is around US$12.6 million. Defunct 20 years ago.

External links

Commodity exchanges
Futures exchanges
Economy of the Philippines
Economy of Metro Manila
Makati